Cocamba is a locality in Victoria, Australia, located approximately 10 km from Manangatang, Victoria.

Cocamba Post Office opened on 13 December 1913 and closed in 1941.

References

Towns in Victoria (Australia)
Rural City of Swan Hill